Daut Demaku born on October 13, 1944 in the Abria village (Drenica, Kosovo ), is Albanian writer and lecturer of the course "The Art of Positive Thinking".

Biography 
He was schooled in his hometown and in Pristina. Four years was editor of the student newspaper of Kosovo "Bota e Re" (New World)  and a mandate was president of the League of Students of Kosovo.

A long time was editor of the editorial desk of Rilindja Magazine, editor of the book publishing Agricultural Cooperative in Pristina and finally the director of Rilindja Publishing House. His works are translated into English, Norwegian, Macedonian and Serbian.

Works

References

External links
Positive Thinking (Albanian) 21.06.2016

Kosovo Albanians
1944 births
Albanian writers
Living people
Kosovan writers